Manikandan R. Achari is an Indian actor who has appeared in many Malayalam films and theatre productions. He made his film debut in the 2016 film Kammatipaadam.

Personal life 
Manikandan was born in 1980 at Thrippunithura, Kerala. He married his girlfriend Anjali on April 26, 2020. The couple was blessed with a baby boy on March 20, 2021.

Awards and nominations

Filmography

All films are in Malayalam language unless otherwise noted.

References

External links 
 

Male actors in Malayalam cinema
Living people
Indian male film actors
Male actors from Kochi
Year of birth missing (living people)
21st-century Indian male actors